Route 413 or Highway 413 may refer to:

Canada
 Newfoundland and Labrador Route 413
Ontario Highway 413

Costa Rica
 National Route 413

Japan
 Japan National Route 413

United Kingdom
  A413 road Gerrards Cross - Towcester

United States
  Georgia State Route 413 (unsigned designation for Interstate 675)
  Louisiana Highway 413
  Maryland Route 413
  Missouri Route 413
  New Jersey Route 413
 New York:
  New York State Route 413 (former)
  County Route 413 (Erie County, New York)
  Oregon Route 413
  Pennsylvania Route 413
  South Carolina Highway 413
  Virginia State Route 413
  Wyoming Highway 413
Territories
  Puerto Rico Highway 413